Specklinia grisebachiana is a species of orchid plant native to Cuba and the Dominican Republic.

References 

grisebachiana
Flora of Cuba
Flora of the Dominican Republic
Flora without expected TNC conservation status
Taxa named by Alfred Cogniaux